On 15 June 2013, a series of bombings and a subsequent siege resulted in the deaths of 26 people and injuries to dozens more. On the same day, separatist militants attacked and demolished the historic Quaid-e-Azam Residency in Ziarat.

Attacks 

The attacks began with the detonation of an explosive device attached to a bus carrying students from Sardar Bahadur Khan Women's University. The blast completely destroyed the vehicle, killing 14 women and injuring 19 others. A short time later, a suicide bomber struck at the nearby Bolan Medical Complex, where victims of the initial bombing were being treated. A team of five gunmen then forced its way into the compound, as senior Quetta political officials were visiting the injured, sparking an hours-long shootout with security forces. The siege ended with at least 12 casualties, including four attackers, four Pakistan Army soldiers and four hospital nurses. One of the gunmen survived the assault and was captured by government forces.

It is believed that the intended targets of the bus bombing were Shia from the Hazara ethnic minority, who have been the targets of previous sectarian attacks in Balochistan. However, due to an earlier change of route, the bus carried a more ethnically mixed group and has been described as "the wrong target" of the perpetrators.

See also

Human rights violations in Balochistan

References 

2013 murders in Pakistan
21st-century mass murder in Pakistan
Islamic terrorist incidents in 2013
Mass murder in 2013
Lashkar-e-Jhangvi attacks
Terrorist incidents in Pakistan in 2013
Suicide bombings in Pakistan
Mass shootings in Pakistan
Terrorist incidents in Quetta
Attacks on universities and colleges